Goon may refer to:

Slang

 Humans:
 People noted for brutality, or otherwise as targets of contempt:
 A guard in a prisoner of war camp (British World War II usage)
 An enforcer (ice hockey)
 A hired thug, in a goon squad
 Alternative name for the character in "Kilroy was here"-style graffiti
 Goons, members of the Something Awful user forums
 Box wine, as Australian slang

Specific persons 
 The Goons, performers in The Goon Show
 Bill Irwin (wrestler), briefly known by the ring name "The Goon"

Books and comics
 The Goon, comic book series created by Eric Powell
 One of a fictional race of creatures living on Goon Island in the Popeye cartoon series (see Alice the Goon)
 Mr Goon, oafish local policeman in Enid Blyton's Five Find-Outers series of children's books

Radio, film and TV
 The Goon Show, a British radio comedy programme
 Goon (film), a 2011 comedy film starring Seann William Scott
 Goon: Last of the Enforcers, a 2017 sequel, also starring Seann William Scott
 Goon, a character in the 2021 Canadian-American movie Mister Sister
 Goon, a Terrakor from the cartoon Robotix

Music
 "The Goon Drag," instrumental tune recorded 1941 by Sammy Price and His Texas Bluesicians
 Goon (Tobias Jesso Jr. album), 2015
 Goon (Global Goon album), a 1996 release by Global Goon
 "Goon", a song by Seaway from Colour Blind

Acronyms
 GOONs, Guardians of the Oglala Nation, private paramilitary group active on the Pine Ridge Indian Reservation during the early 1970s
 GOONS, an acronym for the Guild of One-Name Studies

See also

 Go-on, a possible way of reading certain Japanese Kanji
 Goon Squad (disambiguation) 
 
 Gooney (disambiguation)
 Goonies (disambiguation)